Gerald B. Sullivan (born January 15, 1952) is a former professional American football player who was an offensive lineman for eight seasons for the Cleveland Browns. In December 2012, Sullivan, along with former players Bruce Herron and Raymond Austin filed a lawsuit against the National Football League for their handling of concussions.

References

1952 births
Living people
Sportspeople from Oak Park, Illinois
Illinois Fighting Illini football players
Cleveland Browns players